True faith may refer to:

 One true faith, the religious concept that claims superiority over other beliefs

Music
 "True Faith" (song), a song by the English band New Order
 True Faith (band), a Filipino musical group
 True Faith, an alias for Jeff Mills, American techno DJ and producer
 Tru Faith, a UK garage act best known in a collaboration as Tru Faith & Dub Conspiracy

Literature
 True Faith (comics), a comics story from Crisis, written by Garth Ennis
 True Faith and Allegiance, a political thriller novel